Sverchkovskaya is a rural locality (a village) in Zaborskoye Rural Settlement, Tarnogsky District, Vologda Oblast, Russia. The population was 53 as of 2002.

Geography 
Sverchkovskaya is located 16 km west of Tarnogsky Gorodok (the district's administrative centre) by road. Romashevsky Pogost is the nearest rural locality.

References 

Rural localities in Tarnogsky District